Abram "Itska" Rizhinashvili (April 12, 1886 – July 17, 1906) was a Georgian Jew from Kutaisi (then part of the Russian Empire. He studied at the Kutaisi Real Gymnasium and became involved in the social-democratic movement. While studying at the Leipzig University, he joined a local Bolshevik group in 1904. Back to Georgia in 1905, he helped propagate Marxist ideas among the army soldiers stationed in Imereti and Samegrelo. He was assassinated by a Tsarist police agent in Kutaisi; Rizhinashvili was 20 years of age.

His story is described in a 1936 play by the Georgian Jewish writer Gerzel Baazov.

References 

Georgian Soviet Encyclopedia, volume 8, p. 395.

1886 births
1906 deaths
Assassinated politicians from Georgia (country)
Communists from Georgia (country)
Revolutionaries from Georgia (country)
Jewish socialists
Jews from Georgia (country)
Old Bolsheviks
Russian Social Democratic Labour Party members